The 1980 Nice International Open was a men's tennis tournament played on outdoor clay courts at the Nice Lawn Tennis Club in Nice, France, and was part of the 1980 Volvo Grand Prix. It was the ninth edition of the tournament and was held from 24 March until 30 March 1980. First-seeded Björn Borg won his second singles title at the event after 1977.

Finals

Singles
 Björn Borg defeated  Manuel Orantes 6–2, 6–0, 6–1
 It was Borg's 3rd singles title of the year and the 55th of his career.

Doubles
 Kim Warwick /  Chris Delaney defeated  Stanislav Birner /  Jiří Hřebec 6–4, 6–0

References

External links
 ITF tournament edition details

Nice International Open
1980
Nice International Open
Nice International Open
20th century in Nice